Vassilis Kavvadas (alternate spellings: Vasilis, Vasileios) (Greek: Βασίλης Καββαδάς; born December 28, 1991) is a Greek professional basketball player for Aris of the Greek Basket League. He is 2.06 m (6 ft 9 in) tall  and he plays at the center position.

Professional career
After playing with Ionikos Nikaias at the youth levels, and in the 3rd-tier level amateur competition Greek C League, Kavvadas began his professional career with the 1st-tier Greek League club Panionios, during the 2010–11 season, after having originally signed with the Greek League club Maroussi. He joined the Greek EuroLeague club Olympiacos in 2013. In 2015, he was loaned by Olympiacos to Arkadikos, for the 2015–16 season.

On July 26, 2016, Kavvadas signed a two-year deal with the Greek team Aris Thessaloniki.

On November 24, 2017, Kavvadas signed with the Greek team AEK Athens for the rest of the 2017–18 season, with an option for renewal for another year. With AEK, he won the Greek Cup title, in 2018.

On July 28, 2019, Kavvadas moved back to Thessaloniki and signed with Iraklis. He averaged 9.1 points and 6.1 rebounds per game. On July 29, 2020, he renewed his contract with the team. He proceeded to average 12.3 points, 8.9 rebounds, and 1.1 blocks per game in 2020–21 Greek Basket League.

On July 31, 2021, Kavvadas signed a two-year (1+1) deal with Greek Basket League champions Panathinaikos. In 20 league games, he averaged 3 points and 1.9 rebounds, playing around 7 minutes per contest. Additionally, in 11 EuroLeague games, he posted an improved 5.3 points and 1.7 rebounds in 11 minutes per contest. His season highlight was a 17 points & 6 rebounds performance at home court against Crvena zvezda on February 25, 2022. On July 19, 2022, Kavvadas parted ways with the historic club.

On August 2, 2022, Kavvadas returned to for Aris.

National team career

Greek junior national team
Kavvadas played at the 2009 FIBA Europe Under-18 Championship, with the Under-18 national team of Greece.

Greek senior national team
In 2012, Kavvadas was invited to train with the Greece men's national basketball team, for the first time. He played with the Greece men's national team at the EuroBasket 2013 and in the 2020 Olympic Qualifying Tournament in Victoria, Canada, under coach Rick Pitino.

Career statistics

Domestic Leagues

Regular season

|-
| 2016–17
| style="text-align:left;"| Aris
| align=center | GBL
| 18 || 16.4 || .701 || – || .500 || 3.7 || .1 || .1 || .9 || 9.7
|-
| 2017–18
| style="text-align:left;"| A.E.K.
| align=center | GBL
| 19 || 9.0 || .741 || – || .549 || 1.9 || .2 || .1 || .5 || 5.7
|-
| 2018–19
| style="text-align:left;"| A.E.K.
| align=center | GBL
| 2 || 5.5 || .000 || – || 1.000 || 2.0 || .5 || 0 || .5 || 1.0
|}

FIBA Champions League

|-
| style="text-align:left" | 2016–17
| style="text-align:left;" | Aris
| 10 || 14.5 || .667 || – || .559 || 3.2 || .4 || .3 || 1.7 || 7.9
|-
| style="text-align:left;background:#AFE6BA;" | 2017–18†
| style="text-align:left;" | A.E.K.
| 11 || 5.2 || .500 || – || .750 || 1.2 || 0 || .1 || .6 || 1.6
|-
| style="text-align:left;" | 2018–19
| style="text-align:left;" | A.E.K.
| 2 || 12.2 || .429 || – || .500 || 2.5 || 0 || 0 || 0 || 5.0
|}

Awards and accomplishments

Youth level
Greek League Youth All-Star Game Slam Dunk Champion: (2013)

Pro career
FIBA Champions League Champion: (2018)
Greek League Champion: (2015)
Greek Cup Winner: (2018)
4× Greek League All-Star: (2013, 2014, 2018, 2020)
Greek League blocks leader: (2016)

References

External links
 Vassilis Kavvadas at fiba.com
 Vassilis Kavvadas at fibaeurope.com
 Vassilis Kavvadas at euroleague.net
 Vassilis Kavvadas at nbadraft.net
 Vassilis Kavvadas at draftexpress.com
 Vassilis Kavvadas at eurobasket.com
 Vassilis Kavvadas at esake.gr 
 Vassilis Kavvadas at basket.gr 

1991 births
Living people
AEK B.C. players
Aris B.C. players
Arkadikos B.C. players
Centers (basketball)
Greek men's basketball players
Ionikos Nikaias B.C. players
Iraklis Thessaloniki B.C. players
Olympiacos B.C. players
Panathinaikos B.C. players
Panionios B.C. players
Basketball players from Athens